The Vagabonds Act 1530 (22 Henry VIII c.12) was an act passed under Henry VIII and is a part of the Tudor Poor Laws of England. In full, it was entitled "An Act directing how aged, poor and impotent Persons, compelled to live by Alms, shall be ordered; and how Vagabonds and Beggars shall be punished."

Under this act, vagabonds were subject to the harsher punishment of whipping, rather than the stocks. However, it also created provisions for those who were unable to work due to sickness, age, or disability. These "impotent" beggars could become licensed to beg by their local Justices of the Peace. For this reason, this statute is recognised as the first English poor law to be at least partially aimed at providing relief, rather than punishing vagrancy, because it made the Justices of the Peace responsible for the licensed poor within their district.

References

1530 in England
English Poor Laws
1530
1530 in law